Cosmioneidaceae is a family of diatoms belonging to the order Naviculales.

Genera:
 Cosmioneis D.G.Mann & Stickle

References

Naviculales
Diatom families